Kondhar Chincholi is a village in the Karmala taluka of Solapur district in Maharashtra state, India.

Demographics
Covering  and comprising 281 households at the time of the 2011 census of India, Kondhar Chincholi had a population of 1387. There were 724 males and 663 females, with 155 people being aged six or younger.

References

Villages in Karmala taluka